Richard Ash may refer to:

Richard Ash (MP) (died 1394/1395), or Nash, English politician
Richard Ash (American football) (born 1992), American football defensive tackle

See also

Richard Ashe (disambiguation)